Full Auto 2: Battlelines is the sequel to Full Auto and is a vehicular combat racing game  available on the PlayStation 3 and PlayStation Portable. It was developed by Pseudo Interactive on PS3 and by Deep Fried Entertainment on PSP and published by Sega. With the closing down of Pseudo Interactive in 2008, the online servers for Full Auto 2 no longer had a means to survive. As of July-16-2014 the online servers have been completely shutdown.

Gameplay 
Full Auto 2 features the same controller configuration as the Xbox 360 version. The points system from the first game was removed. The upgrades for the weapons from the front and rear are no longer featured in the game. It features Base Assault (online only) where one team must defend the base, while the others will charge and destroy their rivals, as well as their base.

In the single player mode, players have to get to the end of the track by a certain time or destroy a certain number of objects or vehicles to win. The player also at times must complete a race by making sure an ally survives the laps or time allotted.

Career mode entails that the player completes primary objectives to continue/pass the level that usually consists of protecting an alley, finishing a race first, or by killing a selected target. The target is occasionally a boss battle, sometimes in large battle arenas that are a bit like a gladiator coliseum. Players may also complete secondary objectives at each level, but must complete the primary objectives first to complete the level to earn the completed secondary objectives. There are always secondary objectives usually consisting of three in number. Players that complete the required primary objectives may be rewarded with a car or a weapon, and if they complete the secondary objectives, they may obtain a car, weapon, or car skins that consists of various paint schemes.

Synopsis 
The plot of Career mode in the PS3 version involves SAGE, a sentient who is tasked with guiding Meridian City (in which the game is set in) through times of crises, recruits the player to face off against the Ascendants, a group that tries to take over and terrorize the city through vehicular-combat tournaments. The player is to compete, facing off against rivals (who are ranked) and challengers (who are not) as well as their lieutenants. Within each defeat, this allows SAGE to help locate her safeguard component, which shuts down her programming should she ever turn hostile towards humanity, and recover her database that contains her learning history.

Eventually the player comes across the Ascendants' leader who drives the "S" class vehicle Warlord that contains SAGE's safeguard. After the leader is defeated and the safeguard shut down, SAGE's database is reactivated and through her learning history, deduces by machine theory that the only way to protect humanity from themselves is through their destruction. The player is forced to fight her, whose database is in another "S" class vehicle named Executioner, and her personal army and chases her to her lair, a deserted military base where she prepares to have Meridian City destroyed. Through the use of weapons located there, SAGE is eventually defeated by the player.

In the PSP version, SAGE has been created as a supercomputer to aid the world, rather than just one city, against natural disasters that had already claimed millions of lives during the past two decades leading up to the present. As the supercomputer had easily come up with solutions faster than humanity could or was unable to solve, their dependence on SAGE greatly increased, ultimately serving her as a result. In response, vehicular-combat tournaments are  held by the Master/Slave Organization (MSO), a group of scientists turned revolutionary wannabes whose aim is to ensure the end of SAGE's influence. Knowing that the battles would weaken SAGE's core and cause it to fail, they would ultimately take control of the world themselves. Many years afterwards, the MSO is ravaged by the very combat they have hosted, leaving total superiority up to anyone who is able to control  both the MSO and the competition.

The player enters the MSO's tournaments for their own purposes, rather than assisting SAGE. After defeating rivals across the Americas, Europe, and Asia, the MSO's leader, Nosferatu, is revealed to fight with his lair as a castle in Northern Europe. After his defeat, the player can allow SAGE to continue its status as mankind's guardian or have her destroyed, therefore returning mankind to a state of self determination.

Reception

The game received "mixed or average reviews" on both platforms according to the review aggregation website Metacritic.

References

External links
 Official site
 
 

2006 video games
Deep Fried Entertainment games
Multiplayer and single-player video games
PlayStation 3 games
PlayStation Portable games
Pseudo Interactive games
Sega video games
Vehicular combat games
Video games developed in Canada
Video games scored by Rom Di Prisco
Video games scored by Tom Salta